Horní Hoštice is a small village and part of the town of Javorník in the Olomouc Region in Czech Republic. It is located in the foothills of the Golden Mountains in the Sudetes, on the border with Poland.

History
The village was first mentioned in the Liber fundationis episcopatus Vratislaviensis from around 1295, when it was part of the Duchy of Nysa within fragmented Piast-ruled Poland. Later on, the duchy passed under Bohemian (Czech) suzerainty. After the 18th-century Silesian Wars, the newly-drawn border divided the village in two. The present-day Czech village Horní Hoštice remained within the Duchy of Nysa under Bohemian suzerainty, while the present-day Polish village Gościce fell to Prussia. Following the duchy's dissolution in 1850, Horní Hoštice was incorporated directly into Bohemia, and after World War I, from 1918, it formed part of Czechoslovakia. According to Statistik des Deutschen Reichs, Band 450; Teil II - Sudetendeutsche Gebiete und Memelland Horní Hoštice had 394 inhabitants in 1930 and 375 in 1939.

During the German occupation (World War II), the occupiers operated a forced labour subcamp of the Stalag VIII-B/344 prisoner-of-war camp in the village. After the war, the remaining German-speaking population was expelled in accordance to the Potsdam Agreement and the village was restored to Czechoslovakia.

Notes

References
 Gernot, Ludwig und Wolf, Kurt  - Jauernig und das Jauerniger Ländchen. Das 2. Heimatbuch des ehemaligen Gerichtsbezirkes Jauernig - 1995.
 Hosák, Ladislav - Historický místopis Moravy a Slezska v letech 1848-1960 - 1967, Profil Ostrava.
 Kuča, Karel - Města a městečka v Čechách, na Moravě a ve Slezsku II. díl - 1997, Libri Praha.
 Pachl, Hans - Jauernig und das Jauerniger Ländchen. Ein Heimatbuch des ehemaligen Gerichtsbezirks Jauernig - 1983.
 Statistik des Deutschen Reichs, Band 450; Teil II - Sudetendeutsche Gebiete und Memelland. Amtliches Gemeindeverzeichnis für das Deutsche Reich. Berlin. 1939

External links 
 Website of microregion Javornicko
 Web-page about the Rychlebské Hory and Jeseníky mountains
 Web-page about the Rychlebské Hory region

Neighbourhoods in the Czech Republic
Populated places in Jeseník District